Riders of the West is a 1942 American Western film directed by Howard Bretherton and written by Adele Buffington. This is the seventh film in Monogram Pictures' Rough Riders series, and stars Buck Jones as Marshal Buck Roberts, Tim McCoy as Marshal Tim McCall and Raymond Hatton as Marshal Sandy Hopkins, with Sarah Padden, Harry Woods and Christine McIntyre. The film was released on August 21, 1942.

Plot

Cast          
Buck Jones as Buck Roberts
Tim McCoy as Tim McCall
Raymond Hatton as Sandy Hopkins
Sarah Padden as Ma Turner
Harry Woods as Duke Mason
Christine McIntyre as Hope Turner
Charles King as Hogan
Milburn Morante as Joe
Walter McGrail as Miller
Dennis Moore as Steve Holt

See also
The Rough Riders series:
 Arizona Bound
 The Gunman from Bodie
 Forbidden Trails
 Below the Border
 Ghost Town Law
 Down Texas Way
 Riders of the West
 West of the Law

References

External links
 

1942 films
American Western (genre) films
1942 Western (genre) films
Monogram Pictures films
Films directed by Howard Bretherton
American black-and-white films
1940s English-language films
1940s American films